Povžane is a small village next to Materija in the Municipality of Hrpelje-Kozina in the Littoral region of Slovenia close to the border with Croatia.

References

External links

Povžane on Geopedia

Populated places in the Municipality of Hrpelje-Kozina